Matteo Zanusso (born 9 April 1993) is an Italian rugby union player who plays as a Prop. He currently competes for Benetton in the Pro14.

Born in San Dona di Piave, Matteo played locally for San Dona rugby club, which is known for its youth academy. Later he joined the first team, of which in his first year, the club achieved promotion to the National Championship of Excellence. In summer 2014, he joined Benetton Treviso, later fellow San Dona team member Amar Kudin, joined as well.

External links
http://www.espn.co.uk/italy/rugby/player/176655.html
http://www.itsrugby.co.uk/player-27279.html
https://web.archive.org/web/20141129013340/http://www.benettonrugby.it/c1_117/zanusso_matteo.ashx

References

1993 births
Italian rugby union players
Living people
Italy international rugby union players
People from San Donà di Piave
Rugby union hookers
Sportspeople from the Metropolitan City of Venice